Chanas may refer to:

 the Nadar caste, one of the South Indian, Tamil castes
 Chanas, Isère, a commune of the Isère département, in France
 Chanas, Iran, a village in Markazi Province, Iran